Calcium/calmodulin-dependent protein kinase ID is a protein in humans that is encoded by the CAMK1D gene on chromosome 10 (locus 10p13).

Function 

This gene encodes a member of the Ca2+/calmodulin-dependent protein kinase 1 subfamily of serine/threonine kinases. The encoded protein may be involved in the regulation of granulocyte function through the chemokine signal transduction pathway. Alternatively spliced transcript variants encoding different isoforms of this gene have been described.

External links

References 

Genes on human chromosome 10